Redline refers to the maximum engine speed at which an internal combustion engine or traction motor and its components are designed to operate without causing damage to the components themselves or other parts of the engine. The redline of an engine depends on various factors such as stroke, mass of the components, displacement, composition of components, and balance of components. 

The word is also used as a verb, meaning to ride or drive an automotive vehicle above the redline. The actual term redline comes from the red bars that are displayed on tachometers in cars starting at the rpm that denotes the redline for the specific engine. Operating an engine in this area is known as redlining. Straying into this area usually does not mean instant engine failure, but may increase the chances of damaging the engine.

Variation of redline
The acceleration, or rate of change in piston velocity, is the limiting factor. The piston acceleration is directly proportional to the magnitude of the G-forces experienced by the piston-connecting rod assembly. As long as the G-forces acting on the piston-connecting rod assembly multiplied by their own mass is less than the compressive and tensile strengths of the materials they are constructed from and as long as it does not exceed the bearing load limits, the engine can safely rev without succumbing to physical or structural failure.

Redlines vary anywhere from a few hundred revolutions per minute (rpm) (in very large engines such as those in trains and generators) to more than 10,000 rpm (in smaller, usually high-performance engines such as motorcycles, some sports cars, and pistonless rotary engines). Diesel engines normally have lower redlines than comparably sized gasoline engines, largely because of fuel-atomization limitations; even a small diesel engine, such as a Yanmar 2GM20 found on a sailboat, has a redline of 3400 RPM continuous, with a maximum 1-hour rating of 3600 RPM. Gasoline automobile engines typically will have a redline at around 5500 to 7000 rpm. The Gordon Murray Automotive T.50 has the highest redline of a piston-engine road car rated at 12,100 rpm. The Renesis in the Mazda RX-8 has the highest redline of a production wankel rotary-engine road car rated at 9000 rpm.

In contrast, some older OHV (pushrod) engines had redlines as low as 4800 rpm, mostly due to the engines being designed and built for low-end power and economy during the late 1960s all the way to the early 1990s. One main reason OHV engines have lower redlines is valve float. At high speeds, the valve spring simply cannot keep the tappet or roller on the camshaft. After the valve opens, the valve spring does not have enough force to push the mass of the rocker arm, pushrod, and lifter down on the cam before the next combustion cycle. Flathead engines can have even lower redlines; for example, the Universal Atomic 4, commonly used as auxiliary power on sailboats from the 1950s to the 1980s, has a redline of just 3500 RPM. Overhead cam engines eliminate many of the components and moving mass, used on OHV engines. Lower redlines, however, do not necessarily mean low performance. 

Motorcycle engines can have even higher redlines because of their comparatively lower reciprocating mass. For example, the 1986–1996 Honda CBR250RR has a redline of about 19,000 rpm. Higher yet have been the redlines of some Formula One cars, with engine speeds reaching over 20,000 rpm on the Cosworth and Renault 2.4-liter V8 engines during the 2006 season.

Rev-limiter and implementation
Most modern cars have computer systems that prevent the engine from straying too far into the redline by cutting fuel flow through the fuel injectors/fuel rail (in a direct-injected engine)/carburetor or by disabling the ignition system until the engine drops to a safer operating speed. This device is known as a rev-limiter and is usually set to an RPM value at redline or a few hundred RPM above. Most Electronic Control Units (ECUs) of automatic transmission cars will upshift before the engine hits the redline even with maximum acceleration (The ECU in a sports car's automatic transmission will allow the engine to go nearer the redline or hit the redline before upshifting). If manual override is used, the engine may go past redline for a brief amount of time before the ECU will cut power to pull it back or auto-upshift. When the car is in top gear and the engine is in redline (due to high speed), the ECU will cut fuel to the engine, forcing it to decelerate until the engine begins operating below the redline at which point it will release fuel back to the engine, allowing it to operate once again.

However, even with these electronic protection systems, a car is not prevented from redlining through inadvertent gear engagement. If a driver accidentally selects a lower gear when trying to shift up or selects a lower gear than intended while shifting down (as in a motorbike sequential manual transmission), the engine will be forced to rapidly rev-up to match the speed of the drivetrain. If this happens while the engine is at high RPMs, it may dramatically exceed the redline. For example, if the operator is driving close to redline in 3rd gear and attempts to shift to 4th gear but unintentionally puts the car in 2nd by mistake, the transmission will be spinning much faster than the engine, and when the clutch is released the engine's rpm will increase rapidly. It will lead to a rough and very noticeable engine braking, and likely engine damage. This is often known as a "money shift" because of the likelihood of engine damage and the expense of fixing the engine.

Redlining in a diesel engine can be caused by the engine receiving fuel from an unintended source, such as flammable vapour in the intake air, or a broken oil seal in a turbocharger. This is known as diesel engine runaway, and can be stopped by blocking the air intake, or opening the decompression valve.

See also
Power band

References 

Redline